Tennessee's 10th Senate district is one of 33 districts in the Tennessee Senate. It has been represented by Republican Todd Gardenhire since 2012, succeeding Democrat Andy Berke.

Geography
District 10 is based in Chattanooga, covering most of the city proper as well as the nearby communities of East Ridge, South Cleveland, Wildwood Lake, and some of Red Bank.

The district is located largely within Tennessee's 3rd congressional district, with a small portion extending into the 4th district. It overlaps with the 22nd, 24th, 26th, 27th, 28th, 29th, and 30th districts of the Tennessee House of Representatives, and borders the state of Georgia.

Recent election results
Tennessee Senators are elected to staggered four-year terms, with odd-numbered districts holding elections in midterm years and even-numbered districts holding elections in presidential years.

2020

2016

2012

Federal and statewide results in District 10

References

10
Bradley County, Tennessee
Hamilton County, Tennessee